Shagan Olympic Sport Complex Stadium is located in Baku, Azerbaijan. Has a capacity of 1,032.

External links
Şağan Olimpiya İdman Kompleksi

See also
List of football stadiums in Azerbaijan

Football venues in Baku